Emmanuel Episcopal Church, a historic church at 15 Newbury Street in Boston, Massachusetts, was founded in 1860 as part of the Episcopal Diocese of Massachusetts.

History
Designed by architect Alexander Rice Esty and constructed in 1861, it was the first building completed on Newbury Street in Boston's newly filled Back Bay. In 1899,  Frederic Crowninshield designed its sanctuary's centerpiece window, in which the allegorical figure Piety, from John Bunyan's The Pilgrim's Progress, points the way to Emmanuel's Land.

The Leslie Lindsey Memorial Chapel, consecrated in 1924, is considered one of the architectural gems of Boston. An all-encompassing product of and testimony to the artistry of Ninian Comper, the work comprises a decorative scheme for the chapel designed by the architectural firm of Allen & Collens. Comper designed its altar, altar screen, pulpit, lectern, dozens of statues, all its furnishings and appointments, and most notably the stained glass windows. The finest Gothic-revival style craftsmen were engaged for the project under the direction of Campbell & Aldrich of Boston.  The chapel memorializes Leslie Lindsey and her husband of ten days Stewart Mason, who were married at Emmanuel Church and perished when the Lusitania was torpedoed in 1915. 
In 1966, the Back Bay historic district was established, protecting any building within its boundaries from exterior changes, including this building.

Its outreach program in the early twentieth century, known as the Emmanuel Movement, was influential in the development of self-help groups for mental health, particularly for alcoholism.  The church is known for hosting Emmanuel Music, which performs Bach cantatas in their intended liturgical setting, coordinated with the lectionary.

It has a cooperative, interfaith partnership with the Jewish Central Reform Temple, with which it shares the building.  The clergy from the two congregations regularly offer sermons for each other's congregations, and members are invited to attend the other congregation's services.

Clergy
 The Rev. Dr. Frederic Dan Huntington, 1st rector, 1861-1869
 The Rev. Dr. Alexander Hamilton Vinton, 2nd rector, 1869-77
 The Rev. Dr. Leighton Parks, 3rd rector, 1878-1904
 The Rev. Dr. Elwood Worcester, 4th rector, 1904-1929
 The Rev. Dr. Benjamin Martin Washburn, 5th rector, 1929-1932
 The Rev. Dr. Phillips Endicott Osgood, 6th rector, 1932-1943
 The Rev. Robert Gifford Metters, 7th rector, 1946-1956
 The Rev. Harold Bend Sedgwick, 8th rector, 1957-1962
 The Rev. Alvin L. Kershaw, 9th rector, 1962-1989
 The Rev. Michael Kuhn, 10th rector, 1991-1993
 The Rev. Dr. William Blaine-Wallace, 11th rector, 1993-2005 
 The Rev. Pamela L. Werntz, 12th rector, 2008-

Windows
Stained-glass windows by these artists can be seen in the church. 
Ninian Comper
Charles Jay Connick
Frederic Crowninshield
Harry Eldredge Goodhue
Heaton, Butler and Bayne
Charles Eamer Kempe
Louis Comfort Tiffany
Samuel West
Henry Wynd Young

External links

 Emmanuel Church, Boston Website
  History of the Lindsey Chapel

Episcopal churches in Boston
Episcopal church buildings in Massachusetts
Religious organizations established in 1860
Back Bay, Boston
Churches completed in 1861
19th-century Episcopal church buildings
1860 establishments in Massachusetts